William F. Milliken, Jr. (April 18, 1911  July 28, 2012) was an aerospace engineer, automotive engineer and racecar driver. He was born in Old Town, Maine.

Life
After graduating from MIT in 1934, Milliken worked in the aircraft industry for twenty years in analysis, wind tunnel and flight testing, with emphasis on stability and control. He was assistant head of Flight Test at Boeing Aircraft during World War II, and was on the first flights of the prototype XB-29 and several B-17 models.

As head of Flight Research at Cornell Aeronautical Laboratory (CAL) he initiated a program for measuring aircraft dynamics in flight using automatic control techniques, accomplishing the first frequency response measurements. Also, as co-inventor of the variable stability aircraft (circa 1948) he was involved in pioneering stability augmentation and modern electrohydraulic flight control systems.

Milliken competed in over 100 post-war road races. He was a founding member of the Watkins Glen Road Races, serving as head of the Rules Committee. He competed in the very first Watkins Glen event in 1948 (in which he rolled-over). "Milliken's Corner" on the original Watkins Glen circuit is named after him. He drove cars such as Type 35 and 54 Bugattis and an ex-Indy Four Wheel Drive (FWD) Miller at Watkins Glen, Pikes Peak, Sebring and many others across North America for 15 years. Later, continuing involvement included a term as Chief Steward for the Formula One US Grand Prix.

As a result of his racing activity, he became interested in automobile stability and control and the potential for applications of aircraft technology. Under the sponsorship of General Motors, vehicle dynamics activity at CAL developed and substantiated the automobile dynamic equations of motion and developed the first variable stability (servo-controlled) cars. The first six-component tire testing machine was developed, leading to TIRF, the original high-speed, flat-belt tire tester in 1970.  TIRF is still one of the most advanced tire testing machines in the world.

Prior to his death, his racing career resumed at a private meet at Bridgehampton, New York followed by several appearances at the Goodwood Festival of Speed and at the 50th anniversary of Watkins Glen. He drove both the FWD Miller Indy car and his own MX-1 "Camber Car" in these vintage events.

Books
Milliken has authored, or co-authored the following books:
 Equations of Motion - Adventure, Risk and Innovation. An Engineering Autobiography by William F. Milliken, 2009, publisher's page
 Race Car Vehicle Dynamics Problems, Answers and Experiments by Douglas L. Milliken, Edward M. Kasprzak, L. Daniel Metz and William F. Milliken, 2003, publisher' page
 Chassis Design by William F. Milliken and Douglas L. Milliken, 2002, publisher's page
 Race Car Vehicle Dynamics by William F. Milliken and Douglas L. Milliken, 1995, publisher's page

See also
Archie Butterworth

References

External links
Milliken Research Associates Inc. official website
The Laura Taber Barbour Air Safety Award - 1967 Co-recipient for pioneering work on variable stability aircraft and early fly-by-wire control, at CAL.
Edward N. Cole Award for Automotive Engineering Innovation - 1985  The award honors the memory of Edward N. Cole, former President and COO of General Motors Corporation, and the inspiration he provided to others in the engineering profession by his continuing search and drive for product innovation.
Inaugural SCCA Hall of Fame Class Announced - 2004  Milliken served as Vice President and as a member of the Contest Board, and he was elected to the very first SCCA Board of Directors. Perhaps his most significant contribution was that he authored the very first set of SCCA General Competition Rules.
AIAA Pendray Award Recipient - 2011 (alternate link)  For seven decades of outstanding technical accomplishments and unparalleled leadership in the field of vehicle dynamics, and for his inspiring autobiography for future generations.
Legends of The Glen - 2011
Legends of The Glen - 2011 (working link added January 2014)
2011 Pioneers of Science Award Winners  Lifetime achievement award from the Hauptman-Woodward Medical Research Institute, Buffalo, NY, USA.  Also additional HWI link
At 100, Bill Milliken Officially a Legend Slice of MIT blog post.
ASME has established the William F. Milliken Invited Lecture.  First given in 2013 in Portland OR, the 2014 lecture was given by Raymond McHenry, in Buffalo, NY.  Other links include Ray's Abstract and the ASME selection criteria.

American aerospace engineers
American automotive engineers
American centenarians
Men centenarians
1911 births
2012 deaths
People from Old Town, Maine
Racing drivers from Maine
Writers from Maine